Chillenden is a village in east Kent, England, between Canterbury and Deal, and is in the civil parish of Goodnestone.

In the Domesday Book of 1086, Chillenden was recorded as 'Cilledene'. A pedlary fair was held here on Whit Monday.

The church, is dedicated to All Saints, in the priory of Ledes after being given to it by William of Norwich. The incumbency included three acres of glebe.

Chillenden was home to the families of Thomas Chillenden and William Chillenden, as indicated by their surnames.

A double murder occurred in Chillenden in 1996. Michael Stone was convicted of killing Lin Russell and her daughter Megan. Stone received a life sentence with parole available after 25 years.

References

External links

Parish website

Villages in Kent
Dover District